Bevu Bella (Kannada: ಬೇವು ಬೆಲ್ಲ) is a 1963 Indian Kannada film, directed by C. P. Jambulingam and produced by T. S. Gopalakrishna. The film stars Udaykumar, Raja Shankar, Leelavathi and H. Ramachandra Shastry in the lead roles. The film has musical score by P. S. Diwakar.

Cast
Udaykumar
Raja shankar
Leelavathi
H. Ramachandra Shastry

References

1963 films
1960s Kannada-language films